GeoBar 2 is the second local season of the reality show The Bar in Georgia.

Synopsis

Start Date: 7 May 2006.
End Date: 22 July 2006.
Duration: 77 days.
Contestants:
The Finalists: Chele (Winner) & Tamuna (Runner-up).
Evicted Contestants: Dato, Guga, Kotiko, Lali, Natali, Nika, Nugo, Shoka, Tata & Tea.
Voluntary Exit: Tazo.

Contestants

Nominations

2006 television seasons